"Tomb of the Unknown Love" is a song written by Micheal Smotherman and recorded by American country music artist Kenny Rogers. It was released in February 1986 as the second and final single from the album, The Heart of the Matter. The song was Rogers' thirteenth number one single on the country chart.  The single went to number one for one week and spent a total of fourteen weeks on the country chart.

Content
The narrator of the song, traveling during the winter season across the country to meet a woman (from whom he received a letter), stops at a diner in a small mining town near Taos, New Mexico, and hears a haunting sound in the cold wind.  He asks the waitress about the sound; the waitress (and several truckers in the diner) laugh it off, calling it "the tomb of the unknown love" and direct the narrator to a gravestone "all by itself, beneath a tree, beside a hill" (the lyrics paying homage to the classic song "Green, Green Grass of Home").  The narrator reads the stone, which talks about a young man who was hanged after killing a woman who had cheated on him.

The second verse mentions that the narrator visits the woman for the very same reason – to kill her for ending their relationship (the letter presumably being a "Dear John letter").  He makes no effort to elude law enforcement, and in the end will also be hanged, only wondering if someday he will be buried in the same manner.  Thus, it is ambiguous whether the narrator actually saw a grave, or a precursor to his own fatal end.

Chart performance

References
 

1986 singles
1985 songs
Kenny Rogers songs
RCA Records singles
Song recordings produced by George Martin
Songs written by Micheal Smotherman
Songs about death
Murder ballads
Songs about New Mexico